Platyrhaphe is a genus of tropical land snails in the subfamily Cyclophorinae of the family Cyclophoridae.

Species

 Platyrhaphe anocampta (Möllendorff, 1895)
 Platyrhaphe anthopoma (Möllendorff, 1895)
 Platyrhaphe bakuitana Bartsch, 1919
 Platyrhaphe balabakensis Bartsch, 1919
 Platyrhaphe balukensis Bartsch, 1919
 Platyrhaphe bicolor (E. von Martens, 1903)
 Platyrhaphe bongaoensis (E. A. Smith, 1894)
 Platyrhaphe buriasensis Bartsch, 1919
 Platyrhaphe businensis Bartsch, 1919
 Platyrhaphe busuangensis Bartsch, 1919
 Platyrhaphe calamianensis Bartsch, 1919
 Platyrhaphe calayanensis Bartsch, 1919
 Platyrhaphe catanduanensis Bartsch, 1919
 Platyrhaphe cebuensis Bartsch, 1919
 Platyrhaphe conula Vermeulen, Luu, Theary & Anker, 2019
 Platyrhaphe coptoloma (Möllendorff, 1893)
 Platyrhaphe cruzana Bartsch, 1919
 Platyrhaphe erronea (Heude, 1890)
 Platyrhaphe eurystoma (Möllendorff, 1894)
 Platyrhaphe exigua (G. B. Sowerby I, 1843)
 Platyrhaphe expansilabris Möllendorff, 1897
 Platyrhaphe fodiens (Heude, 1882)
 Platyrhaphe fossor (Heude, 1886)
 Platyrhaphe franzhuberi Thach, 2021
 Platyrhaphe globula Bartsch, 1919
 Platyrhaphe gradata (Möllendorff, 1894)
 Platyrhaphe guimarasensis Bartsch, 1919
 Platyrhaphe harucuana (O. Boettger, 1891)
 Platyrhaphe hirasei (Pilsbry, 1901)
 Platyrhaphe hunana (Gredler, 1881)
 Platyrhaphe illota (A. Gould, 1859)
 Platyrhaphe jordana Bartsch, 1919
 Platyrhaphe lanyuensis Lee & Wu, 2001
 Platyrhaphe latecostata (Kobelt, 1884)
 Platyrhaphe lateplicata (Möllendorff, 1896)
 Platyrhaphe leucacme Möllendorff, 1901
 Platyrhaphe leytensis Bartsch, 1919
 Platyrhaphe linita (Godwin-Austen, 1889)
 Platyrhaphe lowi (de Morgan, 1885)
 Platyrhaphe lubangensis Bartsch, 1919
 Platyrhaphe malibagoana Bartsch, 1919
 Platyrhaphe mammillata (Quadras & Möllendorff, 1893)
 Platyrhaphe marinduquensis Bartsch, 1919
 Platyrhaphe masbatensis Bartsch, 1919
 Platyrhaphe mersispira Kobelt, 1912
 Platyrhaphe mindanensis Bartsch, 1919
 Platyrhaphe minuta (H. Adams, 1866)
 Platyrhaphe mucronata (G. B. Sowerby I, 1843)
 Platyrhaphe negrosensis Bartsch, 1919
 Platyrhaphe oblitus Yen, 1939
 Platyrhaphe palauiensis Bartsch, 1919
 Platyrhaphe palmasensis Bartsch, 1919
 Platyrhaphe parvula (E. von Martens, 1863)
 Platyrhaphe plebeia (G. B. Sowerby I, 1843)
 Platyrhaphe plicosa (E. von Martens, 1863)
 Platyrhaphe princessana Bartsch, 1919
 Platyrhaphe ptychoraphe (E. von Martens, 1864)
 Platyrhaphe pusilla (G. B. Sowerby I, 1843)
 Platyrhaphe quadrasi Zilch, 1956
 Platyrhaphe samarensis Bartsch, 1919
 Platyrhaphe saranganiensis Bartsch, 1919
 Platyrhaphe scalaris (L. Pfeiffer, 1851)
 Platyrhaphe schmackeri Möllendorff, 1897
 Platyrhaphe sibuyanensis Bartsch, 1919
 Platyrhaphe sordida (L. Pfeiffer, 1855)
 Platyrhaphe substriata (G. B. Sowerby I, 1843)
 Platyrhaphe sunggangensis Lee & Wu, 2001
 Platyrhaphe surigaoana Bartsch, 1919
 Platyrhaphe swinhoei (H. Adams, 1866)
 Platyrhaphe tiagana Zilch, 1956
 Platyrhaphe ticaoensis Bartsch, 1919
 Platyrhaphe toledoana Bartsch, 1919
 Platyrhaphe toppingi Bartsch, 1919
 Platyrhaphe ulugana Bartsch, 1919
 Platyrhaphe vatheleti Bavay & Dautzenberg, 1904
 Platyrhaphe vincentensis Bartsch, 1919

References

 Bank, R. A. (2017). Classification of the Recent terrestrial Gastropoda of the World. Last update: July 16th, 2017

External links
 Möllendorff, O. F. von. (1890). Die Landschnecken-Fauna der Insel Cebu. Bericht über die Senckenbergische Naturforschende Gesellschaft in Frankfurt-am-Main. (1890): 189-292, pls 7-9
 Bartsch, P. (1919). The Philippine Island landshells of the genus Platyraphe. Journal of the Washington Academy of Sciences. 9(21): 649–655
 Möllendorff, O. F. von. (1898). Verzeichnis der auf den Philippinen lebenden Landmollusken. Abhandlungen der Naturforschenden Gesellschaft zu Görlitz. 22: 26-208

Cyclophoridae
Gastropod genera